The Cenotaph to Matthew Henry stands on a roundabout opposite the entrance to Chester Castle, Chester, Cheshire, England.  It contains a medallion by Matthew Noble, and is recorded in the National Heritage List for England as a designated Grade II listed building.

History

Matthew Henry (1662–1714) was a Presbyterian minister, preacher and writer, who founded the Presbyterian Chapel in Trinity Street, Chester.  In 1858 a public meeting was held, chaired by the Mayor of Chester, to invite subscriptions to a memorial fund in the name of Matthew Henry.  This was intended to provide a statue near Chester Castle, to produce a cheap edition of Henry's commentary on the Bible, and to create a scholarship in his name at Oxford University.  However, there was a problem because after Henry's death, in about 1750, the Trinity Street Chapel had become Unitarian, and it was decided that the Unitarians should be excluded from taking part in the fund raising.  As a consequence, subscriptions came in very slowly, and it was decided that, rather than a statue, the memorial should consist of an obelisk.  The obelisk was to be erected in the churchyard of St Bridget's Church, the site being provided free of charge by the rector.  The architect was Thomas Harrison, and the sculptor of the bronze portrait medallion was Matthew Noble; both gave their services free.  The mason was A. McDonald of Aberdeen, and the total cost came to £267 (equivalent to £ in ).  The obelisk was unveiled on 22 August 1860.  St Bridget's Church was demolished in 1892, but the obelisk remained in the churchyard until the building of Chester's inner ring road in the 1960s.  It was then moved to a roundabout opposite the castle.

Description

The obelisk stands on a square base of three sandstone steps. The inscription on the obelisk reads as follows.

The statue was designated as a Grade II listed building on 6 August 1998.  Grade II is the lowest of the three grades of listing and is applied to "buildings of national importance and special interest".

See also

Grade II listed buildings in Chester (central)

References

Grade II listed buildings in Chester
Buildings and structures in Chester
Buildings and structures completed in 1860
Obelisks in England
Thomas Harrison buildings
Cenotaphs in the United Kingdom
Monuments and memorials in Cheshire
Grade II listed monuments and memorials
1860 in England